Arruiz Glacier is a tributary glacier in the Explorers Range of the Bowers Mountains in Victoria Land, Antarctica. It flows west-northwest from Stanwix Peak and enters Rennick Glacier north of Frolov Ridge. It was mapped by the United States Geological Survey from surveys and from U.S. Navy air photos, 1960–62, and named by the Advisory Committee on Antarctic Names for Lieutenant Alberto J. Arruiz, Argentine IGY observer, a Weather Central meteorologist at Little America V in 1958. The glacier lies on the Pennell Coast, a portion of Antarctica lying between Cape Williams and Cape Adare.

See also
 List of glaciers in the Antarctic
 Glaciology

References
 

Glaciers of Pennell Coast